The Château de Lunéville, which had belonged to the Dukes of Lorraine since the thirteenth century, was rebuilt as “the Versailles of Lorraine” by Duke Léopold from  1703 to 1723, from designs of Pierre Bourdict and Nicolas Dorbay and then of the architect Germain Boffrand, whose masterwork it became. It became the home of King Stanisław Leszczyński, last duke of Lorraine and Bar.

Lunéville was listed as a Monument historique in 1901 and by successive ordinances; its princely apartments are looked after by the Ministry of Defence while the structure is the responsibility of the Conseil départemental de Meurthe-et-Moselle.

On the night of 2 to 3 January 2003, a fire broke out that ravaged the château to the extent that the plaster vault of the chapelle royale collapsed. Passing through the attics, the fire destroyed the roof over much of the structure. The restoration of the building and its decors is under way.

See also
 List of Baroque residences

References

External links

Lunéville palace official website

Châteaux in Meurthe-et-Moselle
Gardens in Meurthe-et-Moselle
Tourist attractions in Meurthe-et-Moselle
House of Lorraine